{{Infobox journal
| title = Annual Review of Ecology, Evolution, and Systematics
| cover = Annual Review of Ecology, Evolution, and Systematics cover.png
| discipline = Ecology, evolutionary biology, and systematics
| formernames = Annual Review of Ecology and Systematics (1970–2002)'
| editor = Douglas J. Futuyma
| abbreviation = Annu. Rev. Ecol. Evol. Syst.
| publisher = Annual Reviews
| country = US
| frequency = Annually
| history = 1970–present,  years old
| impact = 14.340
| impact-year = 2021
| website = http://www.annualreviews.org/journal/ecolsys
| ISSN = 1545-2069
| eISSN = 1545-2069
| LCCN = 2003213237
| OCLC = 51651460
| CODEN = ARECBC
}}
The Annual Review of Ecology, Evolution, and Systematics is an annual scientific journal published by Annual Reviews. The journal was established in 1970 as the Annual Review of Ecology and Systematics and changed its name beginning in 2003. It publishes invited review articles on topics considered to be timely and important in the fields of ecology, evolutionary biology, and systematics. As of 2022, Journal Citation Reports gave the journal a 2021 impact factor of  14.340, ranking it third of 173 journals in the  "Ecology" category and third of 51 journals in "Evolutionary Biology".

History
The Annual Review of Ecology and Systematics was first published in 1970, with Richard F. Johnston as its first editor. In 1975 it began publishing biographies of notable ecologists in the prefatory chapter. In 2003, its name was changed to its current form, the Annual Review of Ecology, Evolution, and Systematics.

It defines its scope as covering significant developments in the field of ecology, evolution, and systematics of all life on earth. This includes reviews about molecular evolution, phylogeny, speciation, population dynamics, conservation biology, environmental resource management, and the study of invasive species. As of 2022, Journal Citation Reports gave the journal a 2021 impact factor of  14.340, ranking it third of 173 journals in the  "Ecology" category and third of 51 journals in "Evolutionary Biology".  It is abstracted and indexed in Scopus, Science Citation Index Expanded, Aquatic Sciences and Fisheries Abstracts, BIOSIS, and Academic Search, among others.

Editorial processes
The Annual Review of Ecology, Evolution, and Systematics'' is helmed by the editor or the co-editors. The editor is assisted by the editorial committee, which includes associate editors, regular members, and occasionally guest editors. Guest members participate at the invitation of the editor, and serve terms of one year. All other members of the editorial committee are appointed by the Annual Reviews board of directors and serve five-year terms. The editorial committee determines which topics should be included in each volume and solicits reviews from qualified authors. Unsolicited manuscripts are not accepted. Peer review of accepted manuscripts is undertaken by the editorial committee.

Editors of volumes
Dates indicate publication years in which someone was credited as a lead editor or co-editor of a journal volume. The planning process for a volume begins well before the volume appears, so appointment to the position of lead editor generally occurred prior to the first year shown here. An editor who has retired or died may be credited as a lead editor of a volume that they helped to plan, even if it is published after their retirement or death. 

 Richard F. Johnston (1970–1991)
 Daphne Gail Fautin (1992–2001)
 Douglas J. Futuyma (2002–present)

Current editorial committee
As of 2022, the editorial committee consists of the editor and the following members:

 H. Bradley Shaffer
 Daniel Simberloff
 Judith L. Bronstein
 Aimée Classen
 Kathleen Donohue
 James A. Estes
 Anjali Goswami
 Michael Turelli
 Stuart West

See also
 List of biology journals
 List of environmental journals

References 

 

Ecology journals
Publications established in 1970
Ecology, Evolution, and Systematics
Annual journals
English-language journals
Evolutionary biology journals
Systematics journals